Euscirrhopterus cosyra, the staghorn cholla moth, is a moth in the family Noctuidae (the owlet moths). The species was first described by Herbert Druce in 1896.

The MONA or Hodges number for Euscirrhopterus cosyra is 9308.

References

Further reading

External links
 

Agaristinae
Articles created by Qbugbot
Moths described in 1896